Night Launch is a 1989 novel co-written by former US Senator and astronaut Jake Garn and Stephen Paul Cohen about terrorists taking over a Space Shuttle.

Reception
Publishers Weekly panned Night Launch and said the book had a weak plot alongside forced character conversations.

References

1989 American novels
American thriller novels
Novels about NASA
Space exploration novels
Collaborative novels
Novels by astronauts